The fourth season of Golpe de Sorte (Lucky Break) began airing on SIC on 14 September 2020. The season four of the series stars Maria João Abreu, Dânia Neto, Jorge Corrula, Pedro Barroso, Madalena Almeida and Diogo Martins.

Cast

Main cast

Recurrent cast

Guest cast

Additional cast

Episodes

References 

Sociedade Independente de Comunicação original programming
2020 Portuguese television seasons
2021 Portuguese television seasons